Hellinsia spermatias is a moth of the family Pterophoridae. It is found in Brazil and Paraguay.

The wingspan is 16–17 mm. The head is ochreous-brown, but whitish between the antennae. These are whitish, towards base with a dark line above. The thorax is ochreous-whitish, tinged or sprinkled with brownish. The abdomen is ochreous-whitish, with dorsal series of blackish dots on the segmental margins. The hindwings are grey. Adults are on wing from December to June.

References

Moths described in 1908
spermatias
Moths of South America
Fauna of Brazil